Making Fiends is an American animated television miniseries based on the web series of the same name. The series ran from October 4, 2008 to November 1, 2008 on Nicktoons Network. The series is Nickelodeon Animation Studio’s first animated series to be based on a web series, and follows the evil Vendetta and the new happy but dim-witted girl, Charlotte, at school in the gloomy town of Clamburg. Vendetta hates Charlotte and tries to destroy her in each and every episode.

The series is created by Amy Winfrey and produced by Nickelodeon Animation Studio, with Cyber Chicken Animation Studio and DQ Entertainment Limited animating the show in traditional 2D animation. Winfrey voices Charlotte and her grandmother Charlene, among other characters. Character designer Aglaia Mortcheva is the voice of Vendetta.
All of the voice actors from the web cartoon reprise their roles for the TV series, with the addition of a new cast member and crew member, Dave Wasson, who previously created Time Squad for Cartoon Network.

Plot

Vendetta is a selfish green little girl with the power to make fiends, "hideous things" which she has unleashed on her town to bring it under her reign of terror. The coastal town of Clamburg, once a thriving tourist destination, has become a grim, forbidding place, with stores shuttered and the populace cowed before the horror of Vendetta's watchful fiends.

Charlotte, a new girl at Vendetta's school, arrives determined to make a friend. An "impossibly cheery" optimist, Charlotte rapidly becomes the foil and tormentor of the morose and vindictive Vendetta, by insisting on befriending her.

Vendetta is unable to elicit anything but saccharine friendliness out of Charlotte, and so makes the first of many fiends that are specially designed to "destroy" the newcomer. After demonstrating that her oblivious joy makes her immune to the dangers and terrors of all of the fiends, Charlotte declares that she and Vendetta are "going to be best friends forever and ever."

In subsequent scenes, Charlotte displays an ability to change the nature of some fiends into helpful friends, further frustrating Vendetta's efforts to undo her. Being "oblivious to all that is bad and mean in the world", Charlotte neither acknowledges the damage caused by Vendetta's fiends, nor the threat Vendetta herself poses over Clamburg. Nearly all of the residents, including Vendetta's parents, come to hate or fear Charlotte more than they do Vendetta within the first six episodes.

Charlotte never discovers or understands that Vendetta despises her, and Vendetta is never able to get rid of Charlotte. While this conflict is never resolved by the end of each episode, some minor developments appear to continue between episodes, like the introduction of Buttons 2 and an enormous statue that Vendetta has raised of herself.

Characters

Vendetta and Charlotte attend Mu Elementary School in class room 4. Mr. Milk, a soft-spoken nervous man, is their teacher. Charlotte lives with her grandmother Charlene while her parents (who are astronauts) are away in space missions. Vendetta lives with her shrunk down parents, Violetta and Viktor, who live in a hamster cage.

They all live in the mysterious and gloomy town of Clamburg. Vendetta closed stores she does not like, such as a model toy store. Nearby cities are called Tinspit (which is mentioned by Vendetta to have miniature golf) and Molding. They eat clams, beef jerky, grape punch, and many onions, including onion soda. The town is coastal and was in the past famous for its clams. Before Vendetta came with her fiends, Clamburg was apparently a happy place, as shown in a commercial. It had beaches, happy inhabitants, a thriving clam industry, and a polka music festival.

Fiends
Vendetta makes the fiends through a process similar to baking, mixing together ingredients to form them. Vendetta seems to be the only one in Clamburg who knows how to make fiends, although in one episode Charlotte was able to make a friendly fiend without help from Vendetta. (Vendetta only gave her the ingredients.)

Vendetta gets her fiend recipes from a large green cookbook labeled "How to make Fiends". The base ingredient is a colorless powder, or liquid, called "Fiend Mix" and spiders. Though Vendetta has been shown in episodes such as "Puppies, Puppies, Puppies!" to be able to make simple fiends from only fiend mix, more complicated ingredients are needed to make fiends with more potential. Adding any ingredient that doesn't fit can make the fiend come out entirely wrong, as shown in the promo clip "Ralph" and in the episode "Parentnapped".

There are many fiends that take prominent roles in the show (see Characters), but many fiends are only shown in one or two episodes before disappearing forever. Many fiends were taken from the online series, such as in the episode "Marvin the Middle Manager"; the "library fiends" were previously "noise-making fiends" shown in web episode 16.

Charlotte can manipulate fiends very easily. It has been shown in many episodes that giving fiends sugar of any kind, or sometimes even just showing them affection, can make them turn benevolent. It is unknown whether this is a flaw present in all fiends, a mistake Vendetta repeats by accident, or some unspoken power of Charlotte's.

Most fiends Vendetta creates only have one purpose, and seem only capable of doing one thing. It is unknown if it is just because a lack of intelligence, if Vendetta only surrounds them with one thing to do, or if it is in the ingredients. Grudge, however, is a more complicated fiend who does anything Vendetta asks.

Origins
Winfrey is often asked where she got the idea for Making Fiends. She is not sure, but liked to sketch "strange and fantastical" animals in college. She is often inspired by "silly-looking and improbable" animals. She has a parrot and a pet flounder at home, and once had a salamander.

Music
Series creator Amy Winfrey wrote all of the songs featured on the show. After recording the demo track for each song, they would be sent to series composer, Ego Plum, for production.

Plum is noted for using unusual sounds and instruments in his music. Examples include: dripping water, toy pianos, baby rattles, plastic xylophones, and even a goat. On occasion, other Making Fiends crew members would pitch in to help play the various instruments, lending the music a "home-made" feel similar to the original web series.

Production
A daughter to an employee at Nickelodeon was a fan of Making Fiends. She showed the website to other Nickelodeon employees. They contacted Winfrey to see if she was interested in televising the series.

In early 2004, Nick started negotiations with Winfrey to develop the series into a half-hour television program. During the long negotiation and development period, Winfrey continued to create new web episodes independently, and sell related merchandise in her own online "souvenir shop". In 2006, Nickelodeon began distributing many of the web cartoons as streaming video on their own TurboNick platform, and later as podcasts available on iTunes, in 2007 which is the next year, Nickelodeon aired the web series as an interstitial short and was packaged at the end of ChalkZone and My Life as a Teenage Robot (both shows were produced by Frederator Studios) until 2010 when Nickelodeon made an event called the Super Strange Saturday in which are new episodes of Fanboy and Chum Chum, The Penguins of Madagascar, Back at the Barnyard and The Mighty B!.

The series was picked up for a first season of television episodes in late 2006. Production began in January 2007 and the show started airing in 2008. The show was set to premiere on Nickelodeon, but Nickelodeon decided to cancel its plans for a broadcast on their parent channel, and instead gave this new series to its sister channel Nicktoons (along with the show, Random! Cartoons).

The series premiered on October 4, 2008 and ended on November 1, the same year on Nicktoons Network, the series aired on Nickelodeon from October 5, 2008 - May 23, 2016 (as part of the Nicktoons programming block from 2009-2015), on November 26, 2011, the show aired on TeenNick part of The 90s Are All That marking the first time a 2000s show air on The 90s Are All That until October 12, 2014, but it returned to TeenNick as part of The Splat from October 3 to 28, 2016. The show aired on Saturdays and Sundays at 11:30am and 9:30pm. It received generally favorable reviews by critics. Making Fiends carries a rating of TV-Y7 (FV - fantasy violence for some episodes). The series aired in the US, Australia and New Zealand, and in the Netherlands. in Canada, the series aired on YTV on October 11, 2008, and Nickelodeon on November 2, 2009. In Spain, the series aired on Nickelodeon on October 18, 2008, and debuted on Clan on November 7, 2009 at 8:30am.
 

The writing team of Making Fiends consisted of only four people; Winfrey, Peter Merryman, Madellaine Paxson, and Matt Negrete. In the show's studio, there was a special "thinking couch" for the development of new ideas.

Cancellation
The series was cancelled on November 1, 2008 after one season. The show premiered with no promotion or press release. At one point, it was the highest-rated original program on Nicktoons. After the series ended, reruns continued to air until October 31, 2016.

Animation
Cyber Chicken Animation Studio and DQ Entertainment Limited animate the series in traditional 2-D. The character designs are kept from the web series, with some changed details; such as cleaner lines and brighter eyes. Despite the fact that both versions use Adobe Flash to create animation, the television episodes are cleaner-looking. This is probably because the characters and backgrounds in the web episodes were made of overlapping JPEG files, and that the television series has an actual budget. Also, the colors still go outside the outlines, but it seems more like a second outline than messy drawing. Every building was changed; in the web cartoon most buildings were grey, but were changed to different colors for the TV version. Vendetta's house is now dark green and Charlotte's blue.

Cast
Creator Amy Winfrey voices Charlotte, Grandma Charlene, Giant Kitty, Marion, Maggie, Buttons, and Mrs. Millet. Character designer Aglaia Mortcheva, who also was in the crew for the web series, voices Vendetta and her mother, Violeta. Winfrey's husband, Peter Merryman, voices Mr. Milk, Marvin, Malachi, Grudge, Mort, Ms. Minty, Onion Man, and most fiends on the show. The series' supervising producer and director, Dave Wasson, voices Vendetta's father, Viktor, and Mr. Gumpit. Madellaine Paxson voiced Maggie in the episode "No Singing". Winfrey, however, voices Maggie in all other appearances.

Episodes

Reception

 Dell Antonia at Common Sense Media gave the show 4 out of 5 saying "the dialogue is simple, the animation is intentionally scribbly and dark, and the color palette is limited. The whole thing looks like a kid's flip book. And yet it's funny -- funny for the kind of parents who think Dexter's Laboratory is funny, and funny for any kid old enough to handle the weirdness of rooting for a patently bad girl who will never win and with nothing but a secret, lingering fear of monsters under the bed."

Dan Heching at Tilzy said "clever and irreverent, Making Fiends is a fairly classic series of short episodes. [...] Nothing is left untouched; torture, animal attacks, musical numbers and April fools' jokes. [...] Character development is kept largely to a minimum, in keeping with the classic simplicity of the cartoon, [that is] Vendetta vs. Charlotte."

Marketing and merchandise
Before the series was picked up by Nicktoons, Winfrey sold Making Fiends T-shirts and DVDs with the web episodes at her "souvenir shop". Official t-shirts by Nicktoons were later released.

A 2-disc complete series DVD set was released on June 9, 2009 with the first season including all six episodes. Although it is shown in the gift shop at the Making Fiends official website, it is only available for purchase at Amazon.com in DVD-R format. The entire series is also available for digital purchase at Amazon Prime Video.

See also 
 Amy Winfrey
 Lenore, the Cute Little Dead Girl
 Web cartoon
 List of characters

References

External links

Official website

 

Making Fiends
2000s American animated television series
2000s American television miniseries
2008 American television series debuts
2008 American television series endings
American children's animated horror television series
American children's animated science fantasy television series
American children's animated comic science fiction television series
American children's animated musical television series
American flash animated television series
English-language television shows
Nicktoons
Nicktoons (TV network) original programming
Television series based on Internet-based works
Animated television series about children
Elementary school television series